All About Sam (1988) is a children's novel by Lois Lowry. It is part of a series of books that Lowry wrote about Anastasia Krupnik and her younger brother Sam.

Background
In Lowry's book Anastasia Krupnik, Anastasia's parents give birth to her younger brother Sam, who would feature as a side character in later Anastasia books. Sam proved unexpectedly popular among readers, who asked Lowry to write books about Sam as well. All About Sam was Lowry's first book in what would later become the Sam Krupnik series.

Plot summary
Sam Krupnik is a mischievous little boy, but mostly curious. He is very smart, and from the day he was born, Anastasia was jealous.

The story is told from Baby Sam's viewpoint and consists of his observations, feelings and thoughts, in the manner of the 1989 film Look Who's Talking.

References

1988 American novels
American children's novels
Novels by Lois Lowry
1988 children's books
Mark Twain Awards
Houghton Mifflin books